The 1972 Rhode Island Rams football team was an American football team that represented the University of Rhode Island as a member of the Yankee Conference during the 1972 NCAA College Division football season. In its third season under head coach Jack Gregory, the team compiled a 3–7 record (0–5 against conference opponents), finished in sixth/last place in the Yankee Conference, and was  outscored by a total of 199 to 146. The team played its home games at Meade Stadium in Kingston, Rhode Island.

Schedule

References

Rhode Island
Rhode Island Rams football seasons
Rhode Island Rams football